Grant Stewart (born June 4, 1971) is a Canadian jazz saxophonist.

Life and career
Stewart was born in Toronto, Ontario on June 4, 1971. His father was a part-time jazz guitarist. Aged ten, Stewart played on alto sax solos from saxophonists Charlie Parker, Coleman Hawkins, and Wardell Gray that had been transcribed by his father. "By his early teens, Stewart had already found performance experience with such artists as Pat LaBarbera and Bob Mover". By 18 he "was leading a quartet in Toronto, including for a regular gig at C'est What café and pub"; and he moved to New York City when he was 19.

In New York, Stewart first played with guitarist Peter Bernstein and saxophonist Jesse Davis. He then began playing at Smalls Jazz Club from when it opened in 1993.

His younger brother, Philip, has been a drummer in Stewart's bands since 2005.

For his 2007 recording Young at Heart, Stewart chose some challenging compositions, including by Elmo Hope and Neal Hefti, as well as originals. On Around the Corner in 2010, Stewart also played soprano sax.

Playing style
Stewart plays "steady swinging, muscular hard bop". His sound is "lean and sinewy, yet flush with lyricism, humor and rhythmic possibilities, much like tenor icons Dexter Gordon and Sonny Rollins, to whom Stewart is frequently compared".

Discography
An asterisk (*) indicates that the year is that of release.

As leader/co-leader

As co-leader with Eric Alexander

As co-leader with Fabio Miano

As sideman

Featured

References

1971 births
Canadian jazz saxophonists
Male saxophonists
Criss Cross Jazz artists
Living people
21st-century saxophonists
21st-century Canadian male musicians
Canadian male jazz musicians